Diacetolol is the primary metabolite of acebutolol. It is a beta blocker and anti-arrhythmic agent.

References 

Antiarrhythmic agents
Acetanilides